Chozuba is a town located in the southern part of the Indian state of Nagaland. It serves as an Administrative Circle in the Phek District of Nagaland and is located about 71 km east of the state capital Kohima.

Administration
An Additional Deputy Commissioner's (ADC) office of Phek District is located at Chozuba. Under the division there are 7 (seven) villages.
 Chozuba Hq (3,543)
 Chozuba village (3,419)
 Yoruba (3,353)
 Thuvopisü (2,624)
 Rünguzumi Nagwu (1,193)
 Rünguzumi Nasa (335)
 Khusomi (265)
 Chozu Basa (104)

The Chozuba Town Council was inaugurated on 2 November 2016.

Demographics
Chozuba is a large village located in Chozuba Circle of Phek district, Nagaland with total 793 families residing. The Chozuba village has population of 3419 of which 1674 are males while 1745 are females as per Population Census 2011. 

In Chozuba village population of children with age 0-6 is 604 which makes up 17.67 % of total population of village. Average Sex Ratio of Chozuba village is 1042 which is higher than Nagaland state average of 931.

Education
Chozuba village has higher literacy rate compared to Nagaland. In 2011, literacy rate of Chozuba village was 91.19 % compared to 79.55 % of Nagaland. In Chozuba Male literacy stands at 94.79 % while female literacy rate was 87.82 %.

References

Villages in Phek district